The Toledo Zoo & Aquarium, located in Toledo, Ohio, is a member of the World Association of Zoos and Aquariums (WAZA), and is accredited by the Association of Zoos and Aquariums (AZA), through the year 2022. The Toledo Zoo & Aquarium houses over 10,000 individual animals that cover 720 species. With a large focus on conservation efforts, the Toledo Zoo & Aquarium currently participates in over 80 species survival programs. The Toledo Zoo & Aquarium has over 57,000 members and hosts over 1 million visitors a year.

History

1900–1920: Beginnings 

The Toledo city board believed a zoo was required to make the city a tourist destination. The Toledo Zoo began in 1900, when a woodchuck was donated by Carl Hillebrand to Peter Mettler and the Walbridge Park. By the end of the first year, the Toledo Zoo had a collection of 39 animals, which were mostly donated. The park was unprepared for these donations and was forced to use temporary housing such as ravines and boxes for exhibits. In November 1901, the Toledo Zoo nearly lost their entire collection when the winter housing for the animals caught fire. As a result, in 1907 the Toledo Zoo built their first brick building for housing animals, known as the Lion House. During the early years at the Toledo Zoo, most animals were acquired through donations and circuses, and, due to a lack of proper housing, animal escapes were common. In June 1913, the Toledo Zoological Society (TZS) was founded to spur development, with William H. Roemer serving as the first president. By 1916, the Toledo Zoo had grown to a population of 471 animals. In 1922, there was a change to the organizational structure of the zoo when Percy Jones, the TZS president, officially created the role of the zoo director, also known as the curator of the Toledo Zoo & Aquarium. Frank Skeldon was the first curator for the zoo. Jones and Skeldon created a plan and pushed the zoo towards national recognition.

1920–1929: Before the Great Depression 

By the 1920s, the Toledo Zoo created its first master plan, which called for new buildings. This plan was based on in-depth study of the eight most successful zoos around the world. The architectural style used in their plan was inspired by the Spanish architecture from the city's namesake, Toledo, Spain. By 1924, they had completed the first building of their master plan, the Elephant House.  In order to maintain funding for the zoo, Jones had brokered a deal with the City of Toledo so that it could be managed similar to the Bronx Zoo. The Toledo Zoo became a public/private venture in 1926, allowing financial support from the city while leaving operations in the hands of the TZS. This change led to the formation of the Board of Managers, which was five city officials and four TZS members. In 1928, they completed their second building, the Herbivora (Giraffe House). On Christmas Day 1927, the Carnivora Building was opened to the public, after ground breaking was done by Kermit Roosevelt. In 1929, the Toledo Zoo completed its last building prior to the WPA Era, the Primate House.

1930–1940: The WPA era 

During the Great Depression the Toledo Zoo was able to take advantage of government programs to provide labor.  With the remainder of their master plan in need of finishing, Skeldon, Jones, and Colonel John S. Shelter brokered a deal with the federal government to use depression-era relief efforts to create jobs and continue the master plan. In 1934, construction began on the first Works Progress Administration (WPA) building in the zoo, the Reptile House. Federal funding would only cover labor costs, so the Toledo Zoo had to salvage parts from unused structures. Skeldon created multiple agreements which allowed the Toledo Zoo the right to salvage as long as they cleared the land. In the end, the Toledo Zoo was able to salvage all the stonework, lumber, radiators needed to begin construction of the Reptilia (Reptile House). The Reptile House was officially opened in September 1934, to house over 485 reptiles and amphibians. The same day, groundbreaking took place for the next two relief effort buildings, the Museum of Science and the attached Amphitheater. In July 1936, the outdoor Amphitheater was completed, followed closely behind by the indoor theater in October 1936, and the Museum of Science in May 1938.  As the depression continued, more buildings were added to the zoo. The Aves (Aviary) started construction in 1935, and was officially opened to the public in May 1937. Like other WPA buildings, it was also built from salvaged material, but was the first building in the nation to use glass block for walls.  The final WPA project to open was the Aquarium. An example of creative architecture, the aquarium was built in a curved manner to be the rear wall of the Amphitheater, increasing acoustic viability.  Started in 1935, the building was not opened for use until June 1939 and upon its opening it held many honors.  It was the first public aquarium in the state of Ohio, the largest fresh water aquarium in the world, and the 30,000th completed WPA project in the state.  All of these structures remain in use at the Toledo Zoo & Aquarium today, and it may be the largest collection of these Depression Era relief buildings still in place today.  Additional WPA projects at the zoo included new entrances, the Anthony Wayne Subway, and a wall dividing the Amphitheater from the zoo.

1940–1980: Post-war era 

At the end of the WPA era, with the passing of Percy Jones and Frank Skeldon in the 1940s, the Toledo Zoo was ushered into a new post-war era. In 1946, the Toledo Zoo had begun to invest in amusement with a ridable miniature railway. In honor of the 50th anniversary in 1949–1950, the Toledo Zoo launched their current publication, Safari Magazine.  Since 1948, the Toledo Zoo had lacked a permanent director.  It was not until 1953 that Philip C. Skeldon, Frank Skeldon's son, was appointed as the new director of the Toledo Zoo. Under his guidance with the board, the Toledo Zoo set off to launch a new master plan, which included new attractions including Wonder Valley (a petting zoo), more open air "bar-less" exhibits, and entertainment rides such as a merry-go-round and a helicopter amusement ride. In 1953, the Toledo Zoo housed 3,537 animals. By the end of the 1950s, the Toledo Zoo had created new pens, a gibbon run, and new exhibits along the northern edge of the zoo. A highlight was the indoor trout run, thought to be the only one in America, opened in 1959. In 1963, they continued to expand with the development of interconnecting water pools for water fowl and a pond for flamingos. During the 1960s the Toledo Zoo created educational Talking Storybook Kiosks that would play with the use of a plastic key. The 1960s also sent the Toledo Zoo on safari to South America to help celebrate the 125th anniversary of the Toledo Blade. It was during that safari that the staff of the Toledo Zoo were able to capture 75 new species for display. In the 1970s, the Toledo Zoo, in conjunction with the Toledo Board of Education, created a Natural Resources and Horticulture class as well as a class in animal care. Other additions in the 1970s included Cheetah Valley, Monkey Mountain, concession buildings, and the animal care center.  The final part of the master plan was completed with the multi-level sea lion enclosure that allowed for underwater viewing and four new bear grottoes.

1980–2000: Renaissance 

At the beginning of the 1980s the Toledo Zoo faced a potential closure. With an agreement created by Jones, the zoo was financially tied to a city in a financial crisis.  Massive layoffs ensued and a staff of 70 was reduced to 24. With a passage of a zoo levy in November 1980, they were still left in the face of probable closure. The levy was for capital improvements only, so the money could not be used on animal care, staff members, or other items needed to run the zoo. As a result, the Museum of Science and the conservatory were closed.  To add to the problems, Skeldon was set to retire at the end of the year, and they had not yet found a replacement director. In January 1981, William "Bill" Dennler accepted the position and became the director of the Toledo Zoo. A proposal for payroll increase was denied and by the end of 1981, the Toledo Zoo only had 15 full-time employees.  With the support of the board members, staff, donors, and citizens, the zoo was able to raise enough money to keep their doors open. At the same time, a study by the Toledo Area Governmental Research Association reported that the zoo should become a private, non-profit organization.  Taking this advice on April 1, 1982, the Toledo Zoo was removed from the Board of Members that was created and handed exclusively to be operated and funded by the Toledo Zoological Society.  The TZS also worked with the Ohio Legislature which allowed them to work on the county level, and be able to add levies to the Lucas County Ballots to help finance the zoo's needs. With these changes taking place, the Toledo Zoo was starting a revival. By 1982, the Greenhouse/Conservatory had been renovated and reopened to the public and the Museum of Science was back in operation. The WPA buildings were carefully restored, and in 1983 a children's zoo was opened. The Aquarium had two major incidents occur during the 1980s. In 1982, the Aquarium caught fire, killing 104 fish as well as destroying much of the building. Later in 1987, a tank had cracked sending 20 tons of water rushing out. Toledo Zoo broke ground on their African Savanna exhibit, which included the first ever Hippoquarium in 1986, and the rest of the savanna opening from 1987 to 1989. Because of the success of the Hippoquarium exhibit and a hippo birth caught on tape, the Toledo Zoo was given an opportunity to exhibit two giant pandas on loan from the People's Republic of China. The panda pair arrived in May 1988 and were exhibited through October 1988. This was the first year that the zoo had over a million people attend in one year. The loan was challenged by the World Wildlife Fund, as well as the American Zoo and Aquarium Association, through a lawsuit against the U.S. Fish and Wildlife service. Additional lawsuits followed, but the loan of the pandas remained intact and the lawsuits were settled. This outcry of debate dissolved the relationship with the People's Republic of China, and it was not until 1998 that they allowed another loan of pandas to the US, via the San Diego Zoo. In 1994 the zoo again exceed 1 million visitors with their exhibit DinoRoars!, and again in 1998 with the reopening of the Aviary as well as the introduction of the primate forest. During their regrowth they also created a children's park, a pavilion for events, a catering department, an Emmy Award-winning show called Zoo Today, and re-purposed many of the WPA era buildings. The Carnivora was relaunched as the Carnivore Cafe in 1993, they re-purposed the original Rare Mammal Building into the Kingdom of the Apes, altered the Elephant House to be an events center, and expanded their land across the Anthony Wayne Trail to their now Northern Campus.  In 1997, to connect the two parts of the zoo, the Toledo Zoo erected a pedestrian bridge. The Northern Campus which had previously been parking area opened the Arctic Encounter Exhibit in 2000.

2000–current 

After celebrating the centennial anniversary of the Toledo Zoo, the zoo faced controversy after the death of a female sloth bear by dehydration in 2000. After investigation, the zoo was fined by the FDA and was required to put into effect an animal reporting system to better track any issues on animal concerns.  The Toledo Zoo opened the Africa! exhibit in 2001 and a wolf exhibit expected to be finished the following year. By 2003, the Toledo Zoo breeding programs took off, with the births of sloth bears, elephants, tigers, and other animals. The successful birth of the African elephant was historic as there had only been 12 births in the US since 1995.  In 2006 the zoo hired a new director, Anne Baker. By 2007, the Toledo Zoo unveiled another 10-year master plan of improvements for their grounds, which would include a butterfly house, a new children's area, adjusting the elephant enclosures, and renovating and redesigning the WPA built aquarium building, which was estimated to take seven years. In 2010, the Toledo Zoo made more environmental changes with the creation of a SolarWalk, which consisted of a 1400-foot walk way constructed with solar panels to help with the energy needs at the Toledo Zoo. In 2012, the zoo hired a new director, Jeff Sailer.  The year 2014 marked the opening of penguin beach, flamingo key, and other exhibits. It was also the last year it would be known as the Toledo Zoo. In 2015, the Toledo Zoo finished the Aquarium project, and officially changed their name to the Toledo Zoo & Aquarium. The projects at the zoo have continued with the redesigning of the Museum of Science from 2017 to 2019. Upon breaking ground, ProMedica donated $3.5 million to the project.  In 2018, the Toledo Zoo & Aquarium reopened their underground subway crossing during the Lights before Christmas.

Exhibits

Africa

Africa opened on May 1, 2004, and is  large. It has artificial termite mounds for the free-roaming African animals, such as the Grant's zebra, greater kudu, helmeted guineafowl, addra gazelles, Masai giraffe, white-backed vulture, ostrich, watusi cattle, warthogs, and blue wildebeest. There is also a  section for cheetahs. The exhibit has an observation deck. The exhibit houses the Safari Railway, which circles Africa! The exhibit also has an African animal carousel. Africa! was built on the site of the original gravel parking lot that existed before the bridge was built. In March 2010, a male baby giraffe named Enzi was born whose father, Mowgli, is another famous giraffe at the zoo. In 2016, the Houston Zoo needed the African wild dogs for a breeding recommendation so the zoo replaced them with three young, male cheetahs from the Columbus Zoo. In 2017, two female Masai giraffes were born at the zoo named Kipenzi and Binti. In 2017 the Malawi event center was added in between the indoor Giraffe Exhibit and the children's carousel. It is a rentable space seating 900+ people. It also contains a 14,000 US gallon (52,996 L) aquarium housing native African fish, mostly cichlids.

Aquarium

The Toledo Zoo & Aquarium has one of the most diverse collections of any zoo-aquarium in the United States. The aquarium closed in October 2012 for renovations and re-opened in March 2015. The total water volume is nearly four times as much as the previous aquarium. Two new additions are a large touch tank containing various stingrays and small sharks and a smaller touch tank housing invertebrates, such as multiple species of starfish, a wide variety hermit crabs, horseshoe crabs and pencil sea urchins. The renovations took two and half years and preserved the exterior of the Works Progress Administration era structure. This area also includes goldfish, zebra sharks, an alligator snapping turtle, blacktip reef sharks, isopods, walleye, clownfish, electric eels, bichir, southern stingrays, channel catfish, epaulette sharks, cownose rays, a giant Pacific octopus, horn sharks, neon tetras, Australian lungfish, flashlight fish, arowanas, Japanese spider crabs, African lungfish, a shoal of red-bellied piranhas, gar, Atlantic stingrays, arapaima, a giant gourami, yellow-spotted rays, common carp, South American lungfish, discus, seahorses, a wolf eel, as well as jellyfish, leopard sharks, garden eels, and a green turtle named Tink.

Arctic Encounter

The Arctic Encounter includes grey wolves, gray and harbor seals, and polar bears. Two waterfalls and seven saltwater streams are featured in this exhibit.

There is a freshwater stream filled with fish during regular times. A "kids' cave" shows children and adults what it is like to be a polar bear. On January 12, 2015, three more juvenile wolves were added to the zoo after the passing of two of the female wolves. The new male wolves are named Loki, Lobo, and Tundra. On December 1, 2022, it was announced that two cubs were born at the facility for the first time since 2012.

Aviary

Located in the first room of the Aviary are the demoiselle crane, blue-throated macaws, birds from the Amazon Rainforest, and rhinoceros hornbills. There is an Australian walkthrough exhibit where people feed either budgerigars or many of the other bird species in the room. This currently features birds from either Australia, Asia, or Africa, such as Victoria crowned pigeons, Gouldian finches, spur-winged plover, long-tailed finch, red-throated parrotfinch, Raggiana bird-of-paradise, blue-faced parrot finch, kagu, pheasant pigeons, Nicobar pigeon, scarlet-chested parrot, owl finch, star finch, pink-necked fruit dove, thick-billed ground pigeon, Luzon bleeding-heart dove, plum-headed finch, Pekin robin, crested wood partridge, great argus, bearded barbet, violet-backed starling, Madagascar buttonquail, emerald starling, golden-breasted starling, superb starling, and blue-bellied rollers. The children's area includes emperor tamarins, lowland pacas, southern three-banded armadillos, and Linnaeus's two-toed sloths.

The Rescue Roost

The bald eagle exhibit and rescue is located in the middle of the north side pedestrian ramp to the bridge.  The first inhabitants had an injured wing and a blind eye respectively.

Cassowary Crossing
Cassowary Crossing is located near the south-side ramp for the Anthony Wayne Trail Footbridge. The exhibit features the southern cassowary.

Ziems Conservatory 
Ziems Conservatory is available year round for guests to view and learn about plant life.  It is also the winter home to the Galapagos tortoise.

Flamingo Key 
An outdoor pond area consisting of flamingos, Dalmatian pelicans, scarlet ibises, roseate spoonbills, white-breasted cormorants, and other local native and exotic waterfowl including a mudhen.

Kingdom of the Apes

In 1993, the Kingdom of the Apes exhibit opened. It now holds Bornean orangutans and western lowland gorillas. The orangutan exhibit has a pool in the outdoor space and climbing structures.
Two chimpanzees, named Fifi and Harvey, used to be on exhibit at the Toledo Zoo. After the death of the chimps from old age in 2009 and 2011, the zoo chose not to continue the chimpanzee exhibit.

ProMedica Museum of Natural History
Opened in 1938 as the Museum of Science, this museum focuses on natural history. The Museum of Science closed in 2017 for a major renovation and reopened on May 31, 2019, as the ProMedica Museum of Natural History. A two-story tropical rain forest atrium that is surrounded by 30 foot trees, bushes and orchids was added as part of the renovation.

The main-level exhibits include Ohio: After the Ice, Rivers & Streams and Wetland & Lakes.

Ohio: After the Ice features dioramas of animals that roamed the land such as wooly mammoths, saber-tooth cat, stag moose, ground sloth, giant beaver and American lion. Oak Forest lets visitors see life from an ant's perspective and features creatures that are hidden such as an American toad, red-backed salamander, ring-necked snake. Rivers & Streams features salamanders, an Eastern hellbender, and a touch tank containing lake sturgeon. Wetland & Lakes features a rotunda of creatures who live in Lake Erie including the common watersnake, sunfishes, minnows, American bullfrog, and Blanding's turtle.

The upper-level focuses on venomous creatures and the exhibits on this floor includes Arthodpods, Hall of Venom, Venomous Snakes, and Komodo Dragon. 

The Komodo Dragon exhibit features two enclosures for the zoo's Komodo dragons. Arthopods features tarantulas, velvet ants, black widow, walking sticks, beetles, and coconut crab. Hall of Venom features the Burmese vine snake, Gila monster, false water cobra, Paradise flying snake, ribbed newts, lionfish, stonefish and blue-banded sea krait. Venomous Snakes features such as the king cobra, black-tailed rattlesnake, Western diamondback rattlesnake, Arizona black rattlesnake, Russell's viper, variable bush viper, eastern massasauga, rhinoceros viper and Santa Catalina rattlesnake.

Nature's Neighborhood
Nature's Neighborhood is located next to the Museum of Science. It currently contains African pygmy goats, silkie chickens, honeybees, leafcutter ants, feathertail gliders, a tamandua, guinea pigs, crayfish, corn snakes, cockatiels, rats, macaws, an opossum as well as various cats and rabbits. The structure features are a Play Stream, Contact Yard, and a large playground. The area is designed with child safety in mind, featuring a "one-way in, one-way out" construction.

Penguin Beach
The Penguin Beach was built in 2014 and features African penguins and multiple species of duck including the long-tailed duck, Baer's pochard, spectacled eider and the harlequin duck. This is an outdoor exhibit with a little overhead bridge and an underwater viewing area.  This exhibit has produced multiple offspring since its opening.

Pheasantry
Located from the right of the Historic Carousel and north from the playground, this exhibit was built during the aquarium renovation to house kiwi but has also an outdoor viewing of many birds, especially gamebirds including the Elliot's pheasant, green junglefowl, Berlioz's silver pheasant, Mikado pheasant, Reeves's pheasant, Himalayan monal, Swinhoe's pheasant, and Edwards's pheasant. Non-gamebirds include the North Island brown kiwi, crested pigeon, white-rumped shama, tawny frogmouth, chestnut-breasted malkoha, spectacled owl, blue-faced honeyeater, Chinese hwamei, red-billed blue magpie, crested coua, mandarin duck, lesser bird-of-paradise, snowy owl, fawn-breasted bowerbird, laughing kookaburra, and the Australian magpie.

Primate Forest

Located in the Main Plaza, this exhibit holds ring-tailed lemurs, mongoose lemurs, black-and-white colobuses, Allen's swamp monkeys, François' langurs, red pandas, and white-cheeked gibbons. Located near the Primate Forest is the aviary breeding center, which is home to cinereous vultures, waldrapp ibises, scaly-sided mergansers, crested guineafowl, kori bustards, white storks, capercaillies, and saddle-billed storks.

Reptile House

The Reptile House currently holds 1000 species of snakes, lizards, and a saltwater crocodile. Behind it is a Native Ohio Species Area, featuring natural wetland structures and native turtles such as spiny softshell turtles and spotted turtles. Near it is a raptor barn and at the exit is an exhibit for red-footed tortoises and leopard tortoises. Former species include the Cuban crocodile, Burmese mountain tortoises, Chinese alligators, and tegus.

Tembo Trail

Tembo Trail is located on the south side of zoo and is one of the largest areas within the zoo. Tembo Trail currently features African elephants, hippos, North American river otters, grizzly bears, Tasmanian devils, meerkats, Bactrian camels, yaks, naked mole rats, and a Kodiak bear named Dodge. In the recent past, Tembo Trail has also featured slender-snouted crocodiles, spotted-necked otters, southern white rhinos, dromedaries, and white lions on loan from Siegfried and Roy. Tembo Trail exhibits an Indian rhino named Aashish who was acquired from The Wilds in early 2018.

One of the most famous exhibits within Tembo Trail is the Hippoquarium. The Hippoquarium houses the zoo's two hippos which can be viewed underwater. The Toledo Zoo was the first to have such viewing of hippos and was also the first to film the underwater birth of a hippo.

Tiger Terrace

Located near the entrance is an Andean bear named Nieve who at 29 years old is the oldest recorded female Andean bear on the planet. It also includes Amur tigers, Patagonian maras, and North American cougars. It also holds maned wolves and dingoes that are located near the ramp for the Anthony Wayne Trail Footbridge. Former species have included white-naped cranes and sloth bears.

Snow Leopards

The exhibit features two connected mesh/chain link enclosures. The zoo's breeding pair have produced multiple cubs. A female cub, named Dariga, was born in October 2017. Another female cub, named Babochka, was born in May 2019.

Events and attractions

Aerial Adventure Course 
Guests of the zoo can participate in various above ground adventures in Africa! The Aerial Adventure course includes zip lining, a sky bridge, a quick jump, a flight line, and a challenge course.

African Carousel 
Located in Africa!, this merry-go-round is filled with hand crafted African animals.

Aquarium 
Since the reopening and restructuring of the Aquarium, guests can participate in various interactive experiences including live dive feeding demonstrations, a touch tank and ocean lab.

Aquarium Adventure Trail 

The Aquarium Adventure Trail is a newly installed attraction for kids to cool off during the summer months.  It includes a splash pad as well as various other activities for children.

Feast with the Beasts 
An evening of dining and animal encounters, the fundraiser also includes an auction and the opportunity to learn more about enrichment and training for the animals. In 2017 this event hosted 137 guests and raised $66,000 for the TZS.

Garden Tours 
The Toledo Zoo & Aquarium does tours with their horticulture staff to discuss everything gardening.  They even include various workshops throughout the year.

The Lights Before Christmas

The Lights Before Christmas is an annual event held by the Toledo Zoo & Aquarium which began in 1986, with only 70,000 bulbs, and hosting just as many guests to the zoo. Most summer attractions are closed, but all the buildings and trees are decorated with Christmas lights. It features over one million Christmas lights, a winter village including an ice slide and ice bumper cars, the Arctic Blast game, a new light show projected on the carnivore cafe, model trains from the Swanton Area Railroad, and Santa Claus. The "Big Tree", an  Norway spruce tree, contains over 35,000 LED lights, and has been honored as being ranked in the top 10 Christmas trees to see. The main show, Dancing Lights, is near Cheetah Valley. It is repeated several times every night. It uses LED wide-angle mini lights that flash along with Christmas music.

Little Boo at the Zoo/Pumpkin Path 
This event is held in October yearly for a family friendly Halloween celebration.  There is trick or treating, special demonstrations, and the zoo is transformed into a Halloween wonderland.  You can also see the animals enjoy the left over pumpkins as part of their animal enrichment programs.

Luminous Nights 

Started in 2017, this fall event lights up the zoo with over 500 hand-made Chinese lanterns.  It also includes cultural activities led by international students from the local universities.

Medical Mutual Dart Frog Dash 
This yearly run helps with fundraising for the Toledo Zoo & Aquarium as well as conservation efforts.  It is a 5K race and a 5K fun run/walk, that takes place through zoo grounds and the surrounding areas. The 2017 Dart Frog Dash had 2,100 participants and raised $62,000 for conservation.

Music Under the Stars 
Started in 1936, this summer program features various musical stylings performed by the Toledo Symphony Orchestra.  It has had performers such as conductor Charles W. Roth, Jules Blair, Fred Seymour, Conductor Samuel P. Szor (who in 2000 celebrated his 48th year of Music Under the Stars), conductor Leopold Stokowski and more.

Nature's Neighborhood 

Nature's Neighborhood is a hands-on children's exhibit featuring both indoor and outdoor activities.  They offer live animal shows, a petting zoo, climbing equipment and various other items to teach conservation and animal care to children.

Once Upon a Vine 
This yearly fundraising event is usually held in March at the Toledo Zoo, and includes dinner and a live auction to raise funds for the Toledo Zoo & Aquarium. In 2017, the event had 135 guests and raised $63,000 for the Toledo Zoo & Aquarium.

Safari Railway 
Since moving the train from the south campus to the north, the Safari Railway allows guests an informational ride around the plains of the Africa! exhibit.

Summer Concert Series 
Together with Live Nation, the Toledo Zoo hosts a summer series of concerts where well known acts take over the historic Amphitheater. In 2017, over 18,000 people attended these concerts.

Tower Ridge 
Located in Africa!, Tower Ridge allows guests of the zoo, to hand feed the herd of giraffes.

Wild about Art 
This summer event is an annual art show available to all zoo guests featuring local and regional artists. The preview to this even featured 115 guests in 2015 and the fundraiser brought $15,000 for the Toledo Zoo & Aquarium.

Wine Tasting 
Held in the spring, the annual wine tasting event allows guests to enjoy various wine samples along with live music.

Zoo Brew 
Zoo Brew is an adults only event, held in the fall, that highlights samples from local Toledo breweries.

ZootoDo 
ZootoDo, is one of the most anticipated events held at the Toledo Zoo & Aquarium.  It is a black tie with tennis shoes affair offering live entertainment, house specialties, and more.  It is a fundraising event used for conservation during the summer months. In 2017, the event had 1800 guests and raised $240,000 towards animal conservation.

Conservation efforts

The zoo has several projects around the world working with wildlife and habitats.  Zoo employees run the majority of their research abroad, and often participate in expeditions. Some of the most prominent conservation programs are the Aruba island rattlesnake program, West Indian boa conservation, the Kihansi spray toad program (which served to restore a wild population that was declared extinct).

The zoo has a department called Wild Toledo, which focuses on local conservation efforts and scientific research. This conservation department works to re-introduce hellbenders to their native habitat in southeastern Ohio, release thousands of monarch butterflies for fall migration, rear the federally endangered Mitchell's satyr butterfly, restore native prairie habitat in urban Toledo, conduct research on the spatial ecology and population dynamic of several species of threatened turtles, conduct health assessments and vaccinations of local mesopredators, research the movement and presence/absence of native Ohio wildlife with trail cameras, conduct vegetation analysis on ecosystems around the region and work to support and restore native pollinators.  Wild Toledo runs three summer field camps aimed at 10-13 year olds interested in field research and conservation. Wild Toledo also has several partnerships with educational facilities within northwest Ohio where native prairies are installed and interpreted for students.

The Toledo Zoo & Aquarium also currently works with the Association of Zoos & Aquariums as part of their Species Survival Plans, in which they breed animals and trade animals with other zoos around the world in order to reestablish the population of at risk animals.  The purpose of the trading and only breeding certain animals is to maintain clean genetics as well as be able to control the population.

Current conservation projects at the zoo include the Species Survival Program, Wild Toledo, as well as working in the Arctic with polar bears and the Steller's eider, working with Wyoming on a Wyoming toad effort, Reintroducing the Mitchell's satyr butterflies to Indiana and Michigan, working with Ohio and Mexico on the monarch butterfly, a Cuban boa project in Cuba, the Aruba Island rattlesnake program in Aruba, assisting Michigan with the piping plover, the Karner blue butterfly program in Michigan and Ohio, multiple projects in Ohio including hellbenders, native prairies, lake sturgeon, turtles, and the Kirtland's snake.  Internationally outside of North America, the Toledo Zoo & Aquarium is working on projects involving the Kihansi spray toad in Tanzania, snow leopard in Kyrgyzstan, the scaly-sided merganser in China, the Tasmanian devil in Tasmania, kiwis in New Zealand, and Pacific Island birds.

Accolades and awards

1999 
The renovations of the Aviary received an exhibit of the year award from the AZA.

2010–2020 
Nature's Neighborhood received an exhibit of the year award from the AZA in 2011.

The Knot.com named the catering and sales department in their Best of Weddings as Brides' Choice in 2012 and 2013.

In 2014 the Toledo Zoo was named the Best Zoo in America by USA Today.  It was also ranked the #2 zoo in America by Family Fun Magazine, and also the 8th most family friendly attractions. Other areas of the zoo also received special recognition in 2014.  The Knot.com named the catering and sales department in their Best of Weddings as Brides' Choice (3rd consecutive year).  In addition, the conservation staff was recognized by Solar Builder magazine, as Project of the Year, as a result of the solar panel array located on the north side of the zoo.  The Ohio State House of Representatives also honored the Toledo Zoo as the #1 zoo in the state of Ohio.

2015 was another active year for the Toledo Zoo & Aquarium.  Their Lights Before Christmas display was voted #2 best Zoo Lights Display in USA Today, as well as being named in the top 5 Most Beautiful Christmas Trees, for the decoration of their "Big Tree".  The conservation team was awarded with the Public Agency Native Landscape Award, and was named a standout in Ohio Tourism from Ohiotraveler.com  The renovations on the Aquarium also received the 2015 Build Ohio Award 

The Lights Before Christmas was named the #1 Zoo Lights Display in America by USA Today in 2016 and 2017.

The zoo received an award from the Ohio Department of Natural Resources Division of Wildlife with the 2017 Wildlife Diversity Conservation Award.

In 2018 The Toledo Zoo & Aquarium was named 7th on Ravereviews.com for having "weird animals" among 50 zoos in the US.  The Aviary and staff were awarded the Avian Scientific Advisory Group Plume Award.  The Lights Before Christmas "Big Tree" also was named one of the top ten travel worthy Christmas trees to see.  The Toledo Zoo & Aquarium has also received the highest rating possible from Charity Navigator.

Notes

External links 

Botanical gardens in Ohio
Zoos in Ohio
1900 establishments in Ohio
Economy of Toledo, Ohio
Works Progress Administration in Ohio
Tourist attractions in Toledo, Ohio
Parks in Toledo, Ohio
Zoos established in 1900
Works Progress Administration in Toledo, Ohio